Jowle is a town in the northeastern Nugal region of Somalia.

A water pump built by Norwegian Church Aid on donation funds raised in the Norwegian TV Auction 2014 is placed in Jowle; the pump, which pumps up clean ground water from 150 meters below ground, was by 2017 sustaining 35,000 people in the otherwise drought-ridden Puntland.

References

External links
Jowle

Populated places in Nugal, Somalia